Kenneth Hamilton (born 1963) is a Scottish pianist and writer, known for virtuoso performances of Romantic music, especially Liszt, Alkan and Busoni.  Hamilton's playing is characterized by spontaneity, technical assurance, and a wide variety of keyboard colour. He was a student of Alexa Maxwell, Lawrence Glover and the Scottish composer-pianist Ronald Stevenson, whose music he champions.

Hamilton lectures on music. He was awarded a doctorate for a dissertation on the music of Liszt by Balliol College, Oxford, where his supervisor was John Warrack. He is the author of Liszt: Sonata in B-minor (Cambridge University Press, 1996) and the editor of The Cambridge Companion to Liszt (Cambridge University Press, 2005). His widely publicised latest book, After the Golden Age: Romantic Pianism and Modern Performance (Oxford University Press, 2008) discusses the differences between the past and the present in concert life and playing styles. Its conclusions have stimulated extensive debate in the musical world.

References

Living people
Scottish classical pianists
Male classical pianists
21st-century classical pianists
21st-century British male musicians
1963 births